Magic Tales is a series of interactive storybooks for children, developed by Animation Magic and produced by Davidson, which were distributed by Capitol Multimedia, Inc. on CD-ROM for Mac OS and Microsoft Windows. The series was introduced at the 1995 MacWorld trade show. The series began with the release of Baba Yaga and the Magic Geese (an adaptation of the Russian Folklore) in 1995. The stories are narrated by the central character Grandpa Mouse, who reads them to his two grandchildren while they are having a boring time. The series was titled "El Abuelo Ratón" in Spanish. Each story has twelve pages.

Games in the series

Gameplay 
The games featured three-dimensional art; approximately 30 minutes' worth of animation, over 500 "click-and-explore" options and original music. The stories were influenced by the ethnic backgrounds of their source material, and aimed to teach children moral lessons. The games were targeted at children aged 3 to 9.

Reception

Critical reception
The Exceptional Parent recommended the series to parents who wanted to "develop [their] child's interest in words and reading".

Computer Shopper said of Magic Tales: The Little Samurai, "this is the most magical storybook we've ever seen".

Commercial performance
One hundred thousand copies of the first three Magic Tales titles were distributed around retailers around Christmas. The series gained recognition from the Parents magazine. Three new titles out of 3,000 children's titles would be chosen for three additional products to be released the following Spring.

Availability
 The Magic Tales Collection CD

See also
 Disney's Animated Storybook
 Living Books
 The Kidstory Series
 Playtoons

References

1995 video games
1996 video games
ScummVM-supported games
Software for children
Video game franchises
Video games developed in the United States
Children's educational video games